Nikolaj Memola (born 18 November 2003) is an Italian figure skater. He is the 2023 World University Games bronze medalist, a two-time bronze medalist on the ISU Challenger Series (at the 2022 CS Budapest Trophy and the 2022 CS Lombardia Trophy), and the 2023 Italian national silver medalist.

Memola is also the 2022–23 Junior Grand Prix Final champion, a two-time ISU Junior Grand Prix medalist (including gold at the 2022 JGP Latvia), and a top-ten finisher at the 2020 Winter Youth Olympics and the 2022 World Junior Figure Skating Championships.

Career

Early years 

Memola began learning to skate in 2008. He is coached by his mother, Olga Romanova, who is originally from Russia.

He debuted on the ISU Junior Grand Prix (JGP) series in October 2018, placing nineteenth in Slovenia. Memola competed at the 2020 Winter Youth Olympics in Lausanne, Switzerland, placing eighth.

2021–22 season 
Memola finished fourth at the 2021 JGP Austria in October 2021. He made his senior international debut later that month, placing fourth at Trophée Métropole Nice Côte d'Azur. In November, he finished ninth at the 2021 CS Warsaw Cup, his first appearance on the Challenger series. He stepped onto his first senior international podium in December, taking gold at the Santa Claus Cup in Hungary.

Following the withdrawal of Matteo Rizzo, Italy selected Memola to skate at the 2022 European Championships in Tallinn, Estonia. Competing in his first ISU Championship, he qualified to the final segment by placing twelfth in the short program and finished in fifteenth overall. He ended the season making his debut appearance at the World Junior Championships, where he placed seventh.

2022–23 season 
Planning a second split season between junior and senior, Memola had two assignments on the Junior Grand Prix circuit, winning silver at his first assignment, the 2022 JGP Czech Republic. The following week at the 2022 JGP Latvia in Riga, he won the gold medal. Memola's results qualified him for the 2022–23 Junior Grand Prix Final, which he stated he was particularly "happy" about as the event was being held in Italy that year. He said that he hoped to introduce a quad into the free skate in time. Returning to the Challenger series, Memola won bronze medals at both the Lombardia and Budapest Trophies.

Competing at the Junior Grand Prix Final on home ice in Turin, Memola finished second in the short program, saying afterward that it was "very important to me that I did such a good skate at home, in Italy and on the Olympic ice." He went on to win the free skate and the gold medal, albeit without attempting a quadruple jump as he had earlier hoped. This was the first Junior Grand Prix Final title for an Italian man and the first for Italy in any discipline since the ice dance team Faiella/Milo in the inaugural 1997–98 edition. Memola admitted afterward, "I started the season with the goal in mind coming here to Torino, but the first place was not my goal, and then the medal came, and I'm extremely happy."

Shortly after the Junior Grand Prix Final, Memola attended his first senior national championships, and won the silver medal. He finished first in the free skate at the event. He was then assigned to compete at the 2023 Winter World University Games, where he won the bronze medal.

In his final assignment of the season, Memola competed at the 2023 World Junior Championships. After stepping out of his jump combination in the short program, he finished sixth in that segment. He placed fourth in the free skate and rose to fourth overall, 1.35 points back of bronze medalist Nozomu Yoshioka. Memola did not attempt any quadruple jumps during the free program, having found them insufficiently secure in practice that day and not wanting to risk it.

Programs

Competitive highlights 
CS: Challenger Series; JGP: Junior Grand Prix

References

External links 
 

2003 births
Italian male single skaters
Living people
Sportspeople from Monza
21st-century Italian people
Competitors at the 2023 Winter World University Games
Medalists at the 2023 Winter World University Games
Universiade medalists in figure skating
Universiade bronze medalists for Italy